Abdullatif bin Rashid Al Zayani (English ) (born 15 April 1954) is a Bahraini engineer and retired lieutenant general. He is the foreign minister, having formerly been the secretary general of the Gulf Cooperation Council (GCC) from 1 April 2011 to February 2020. He was the fifth GCC secretary general and the first with military background since the GCC was established.

Early life and education
Zayani was born on 15 April 1954 in Muharraq, Kingdom of Bahrain. He graduated from the Royal Military Academy Sandhurst in the United Kingdom. He is also a graduate of the aeronautical engineering program, Perth Scotland (1978). He received a master's degree in logistics management from the Air Force Institute of Technology in Dayton, Ohio, in 1980. He also received a PhD in operations research from the Naval Postgraduate School, Monterey, California in 1986. He attended command and general staff courses in Fort Leavenworth, Kansas, in 1988 and received the sword of honor along with the title of master logistician from the US Army. Later, he attended leaders in development program at Harvard University in 2008.

Career
Zayani had work experience in Bahraini defence forces, in ministerial posts as well as in university. He became a commissioned officer in the Bahrain Defence Force in 1973. His career at the Bahraini defence forces ended on 2 June 2004. Then he began to serve as the chief of public security as a major general at interior ministry in 2004. He promoted to the rank of lieutenant general in 2010. Next, he was appointed adviser to the minister of foreign affairs in the rank of minister on 10 June 2010. He also worked as a lecturer at Arabian Gulf University, and as mathematics and statistics professor at the University of Maryland in Bahrain, and as a quantitative methods professor at the University of Bahrain.

On 1 April 2011, Zayani was appointed secretary general of the Gulf Cooperation Council. Initially, Bahrain nominated another candidate, Mohammed bin Ibrahim Al Mutawa, for the post. However, due to Qatar's strong objection to him, Zayani was later nominated by Bahrain for the post in May 2010. Zayani replaced Abdul Rahman bin Hamad Al Attiyah in the post. His term is due ended on 31 March 2020.

In January 2020, he was named as foreign minister, replacing Khalid bin Ahmed Al Khalifa in the post. On 15 September 2020, Zayani signed the official Bahrain–Israel normalization agreement in a signing ceremony at the White House in Washington, D.C.

References

External links

20th-century engineers
1954 births
Aeronautical engineers
Air Force Institute of Technology alumni
Academic staff of the Arabian Gulf University
Bahraini engineers
Bahraini military personnel
Foreign ministers of Bahrain
Graduates of the Royal Military Academy Sandhurst
Living people
Naval Postgraduate School alumni
Secretaries-General of the Gulf Cooperation Council
Academic staff of the University of Bahrain